Krupište is a village in the municipality of Karbinci, North Macedonia.

Demographics
According to the 2002 census, the village had a total of 336 inhabitants. Ethnic groups in the village include:

Macedonians 313
Turks 12
Aromanians 10
Others 1

References

Villages in Karbinci Municipality